Adil (also transliterated as Adel) is an Arabic masculine given name and surname. Adil is a variation of the name Adel, an Arabic male name that comes from the word Adl, meaning "fairness" and "justice". It is a common name in the Muslim world.

It is not to be confused with the Germanic name Adel, which has a different pronunciation.

People
Adil and its variants may refer to a number of notable people:

Given name

Egyptian royalty 
 Al-Adil I of Egypt (1145–1218),  Ayyubid Sultan of Egypt and Damascus
 Al-Adil II of Egypt (–1248),  Ayyubid Sultan of Egypt and Damascus
 Al-Adil Kitbugha of Egypt (died 1297),  Mamluk Sultan of Egypt and Syria

Adil Shahi dynasty 
 Yusuf Adil Shah (1450–1511), founder of the Adil Shahi dynasty that ruled the Sultanate of Bijapur for nearly two centuries
 Ismail Adil Shah (1498–1534),  Sultan of Bijapur
 Mallu Adil Shah (died ),  Sultan of Bijapur
 Ibrahim Adil Shah I (died ),  Sultan of Bijapur
 Ali Adil Shah I (died ),  Sultan of Bijapur
 Ibrahim Adil Shah II (died ),  Sultan of Bijapur
 Mohammed Adil Shah (died ),  Sultan of Bijapur
 Ali Adil Shah II (died ),  Sultan of Bijapur
 Sikandar Adil Shah (died ),  Sultan of Bijapur

Iranian royalty 
 Adil Shah (died 1749),  Afsharid Shah of Iran

Politics and business
 Adel Chaveleh, American businessman and CIO of Crane Worldwide Logistics
 Adil Çarçani (1922–1997), Albanian politician
 Adel Fakeih (born 1959), Saudi Arabian engineer and politician
 Adel Al Jubeir (born 1962), Saudi Arabian diplomat
 Adil Karaismailoğlu (born 1969), Turkish mechanical engineer, civil servant and politician
 Adel Labib, Egyptian politician
 Adel Mouwda, Bahraini politician
 Adel Murad (born 1949), Iraqi politician
 Adil Nurmemet (born 1968), former Chinese politician
 Adel Osseiran (1905−1998), Lebanese politician
 Adel Safar (born 1953), Syrian politician and academic, Prime Minister of Syria (2011-2012)
 Adel Al-Saraawi (born 1962), Kuwaiti politician
 Adil Shayakhmetov (born 1956), Kazakhstani politician
 Adel Smith (1960–2014), born as Emilio Smith in Alexandria, Egypt, Italian Muslim activist, and radical fundamentalist
 Adel al Zamel, Kuwaiti held in extrajudicial detention in the U.S. Guantanamo Bay detention camps in Cuba
 Adil Zulfikarpašić (1921–2008), Bosniak politician and intellectual

Literature and journalism
 Adil Asadov (born 1958), Azerbaijani philosopher
 Adel Ferdosipour (born 1974), Iranian journalist, translator, sports commentator and television show host and producer
 Adel Hammouda (born 1968), Egyptian journalist
 Adel Karasholi (born 1936), German writer
 Adel Kutuy (1903−1945), Soviet Tatar poet, writer and playwright
 Adel Manna (born 1947), Israeli Palestinian historian
 Adel Al Toraifi (born 1979), Saudi Arabian journalist

Art and cinema
 Adel Abdessemed (born 1971), French Algerian conceptual artist
 Adel Adham (1928–1996), Egyptian actor
 Adel Bencherif (born 1975), French actor
 Adel Abo Hassoon (born 1970), Syrian television actor and voice actor
 Adil Hussain (born 1963), Indian actor
 Adel Imam (born 1940), Egyptian actor
 Adel Kamel (1942–2003), Egyptian musicologist
 Adel Karam, Lebanese television host and actor
 Adil Khan (born 1983), Norwegian actor
 Adel Nassief (born 1962), Egyptian painter
 Adil Omar (born 1991), Pakistani rapper and singer-songwriter
 Adil Ray (born 1974), British actor, writer and broadcaster
 Adel Tawil (born 1978), German singer

Science 
 Adel F. Halasa (born 1933), American scientist
 Adel Mahmoud (1941–2018), Egyptian-born American doctor and expert in infectious diseases
 Adel S. Sedra (born 1943), Egyptian Canadian electrical engineer

Sport 
 Adil Basher (1926–1978), Iraqi footballer
 Adil Belgaïd (born 1970), Moroccan judoka
 Adil Chihi (born 1988), Moroccan footballer
 Adil Ibragimov (born 1989), Russian footballer
 Adil El Makssoud (born 1985), Moroccan basketball player
 Adil Ramzi (born 1977), Moroccan footballer
 Adil Rashid (born 1988), English cricketer
 Adil Shamasdin (born 1982), Canadian tennis player
 Adel Abdulaziz (born 1980), Emirati footballer
 Adel Abdullah (born 1984), Syrian footballer
 Adel Amrouche (born 1968), Algerian football manager
 Adel Chedli (born 1976), Tunisian footballer
 Adel Eid (born 1984), Egyptian-Finnish footballer
 Adel Fellous (born 1978), French rugby league player
 Adel Guemari (born 1984), French footballer
 Adel El Hadi (born 1980), Algerian footballer
 Adel Humoud (born 1986), Kuwaiti footballer
 Adel Kolahkaj (born 1985), Iranian footballer
 Adel Lakhdari (born 1989), Algerian footballer
 Adel Lami (born 1985), Qatari footballer
 Adel Maïza (born 1983), Algerian footballer
 Adel Massaad (born 1964), Egyptian table tennis player
 Adel Messali (born 1983), Algerian footballer
 Adel Nefzi (born 1974), Tunisian footballer
 Adel Sellimi (born 1972), Tunisian footballer
 Adel Taarabt (born 1989), Moroccan footballer
 Adel Tlatli, Tunisian basketball coach
 Adel Abdel Rahman (born 1967), Egyptian footballer and coach
 Adel Adili (born 1974), Libyan long-distance runner
 Adel Belal (born 1987), also known as Adel El Siwi, Egyptian footballer
 Adel Chbouki (born 1971), Moroccan footballer
 Adel Gafaiti (born 1994), Algerian footballer
 Adel Ibrahim Ismail (born 1951), Egyptian basketball player
 Adel Khudhair (born 1954), Iraqi footballer and coach
 Adel Langue (born 1997), Mauritian footballer
 Adel Mechaal (born 1990), Morocco-born Spanish middle-distance runner
 Adel Mojallali (born 1993), Iranian canoeist
 Adel Ahmed Malalla (born 1961), Qatari footballer
 Adel Nasser (born 1970), Iraqi footballer and coach
 Adel Al-Salimi (born 1979), Yemeni footballer

Religion 
 Adil al-Kalbani, former Grand Mosque Imam
 Adel T. Khoury (born 1930), Lebanese-born German Catholic theologian

Middle name 
 Ahmed Adel Abdel Moneam (born 1987), Egyptian footballer
 Mohamed Adel Gomaa (born 1993), Egyptian footballer

Surname

Arts, literature, and entertainment 
 Hany Adel (born 1976), Egyptian guitarist, vocalist, and screen actor
 Zizi Adel (born 1987), Egyptian singer
 Buyong Adil (1907–1976), Malaysian historian

Politics 
 Mohammed Adel (youth leader), Egyptian activist
 Ahmed Adil (born 1973), Guantanamo detainee

Sport 
 Carolyn Adel (born 1978), Surinamese Olympic swimmer
 Deng Adel (born 1996), Australian basketball player
 Mohamed Adel (born 1978), Egyptian football referee
 Ramy Adel (born 1979), Egyptian footballer
 Yathreb Adel (born 1996), Egyptian squash player
 Farhan Adil (born 1977), Pakistani cricketer

Fictional characters 
 Âdel, a character in Pleasure and Suffering
 Adel, a character in Winter of Discontent (film)

See also

Adila (name), feminine version 
Adel (given name)
Adel (name)
Arabic name

Arabic masculine given names
Arabic-language surnames